Dubai Marina, aka Marsa Dubai, is a district in Dubai, United Arab Emirates. It is an artificial canal city, built along a  stretch of Persian Gulf shoreline. As of 2018, it has a population of 55,052. When the entire development is complete, it will accommodate more than 120,000 people in residential towers and villas. It is located on Interchange 5 between Jebel Ali Port and the area which hosts Dubai Internet City, Dubai Media City, and the American University in Dubai. The first phase of this project has been completed. Dubai Marina was inspired by the Concord Pacific Place development along False Creek in Vancouver, BC, Canada.

There have been many instances of marine wildlife (especially whales and sharks) entering the marina, because of its proximity to the open sea.

Development

In order to create the man-made marina, the developers brought the waters of the Persian Gulf into the site of Dubai marina, creating a new waterfront. There is a large central waterway, excavated from the desert and running the length of the 3 km site. More than 12% of the total land area on the site has been given over to this central public space. Although much of this area is occupied by the marina water surface, it also includes almost 8 km of landscaped public walkways.

The marina is entirely man-made and has been developed by the real estate development firm Emaar Properties of the United Arab Emirates and designed by HOK Canada. Upon completion, it is claimed to be the world's largest man-made marina. The current largest man-made marina in the world is Marina del Rey in California, United States. There is a publicly accessible foreshoreway around the marina and some sections of public oceanway along the beach with views to Palm Jumeirah. Its largest development is the Jumeirah Beach Residence. Dubai Marina opened doors to its first mosque Masjid Al Rahim in October 2013, which is situated in the southern end of the Marina, and its second mosque Mohammed Bin Ahmed Almulla Mosque in December 2016.

Phase I
The phase I of Dubai Marina cost more than AED 1.2 billion. Three of the towers are named after precious stones, Al Mass, Fairooz, and Murjan, and the other three are named after Arabic scents, Mesk, Anbar, and Al Yass. The scheme was designed by HOK and the contractors were Al-Futtaim Carillion and Nasah Multiplex.

Phase II

Jumeirah Beach Residence
It is the largest single phase residential development in the world and contains 40 towers (35 are residential and 5 are hotels). JBR can accommodate about 15,000 people, living in its apartments and hotel rooms. The Project has 6,917 apartments, from  studios to  penthouses. Jumeirah Beach Residence was launched in August 2002 from the developer, Dubai Properties (a subsidiary of Dubai Holding) with the cost of 6 billion dirham and was completed in 2007. The Walk at JBR restaurant and shopping strip, which is adjacent to the beach behind JBR, is a very popular location for Al Fresco dining. There are five hotels, rated as 5 star or 4 star, three of which are purpose-built hotels, while the other two are converted residential towers.

The Walk

The Walk at Jumeirah Beach Residence is a  strip at the ground and plaza level of the complex, it was developed by Dubai Properties, and was completed by 2007 and opened officially in August 2008.

The Beach
The Beach at Jumeirah Beach Residence is a retail complex being constructed on the beach in front of JBR by Meraas Holding, a company owned by Sheikh Mohammed bin Rashid Al Maktoum, Vice-President and Prime Minister of the UAE and Ruler of Dubai. The development, comprising four plazas, will occupy the bulk of the beach between the Hilton and Sheraton hotels. The complex houses a number of levels of parking as well as seventy retail and food and beverage outlets, together with entertainment facilities.

Al Sahab
Al Sahab is a residential high rise development that consists of two towers; Tower 1 is a 44-story structure, and Tower 2 is a 24-story structure. The complex is on the waterfront and directly overlooks the largest bay of water at Dubai Marina. The buildings are in the northern end of the marina across from the Al Majara Towers near the Marina Quays. The complex features a gymnasium and squash court, swimming pool and open community area, a mini-theater, sheltered assigned parking, multi-function rooms, and meeting rooms.

Al Majara

Al Majara is a five-building residential complex comprising high-rise waterfront apartments adjacent to where the old Dubai Marina Yacht Club used to be and overlooks the largest part of the bay.

Marina Promenade

Marina Promenade is a residential enclave in Dubai Marina. Nestled within the panoramic confines of Dubai Marina, it overlooks the widest and most scenic part of the bay and is ideally located opposite the Dubai Marina Yacht Club. The Marina Promenade comprises six residential towers and villas with views of the bay.

Marina Quays
Marina Quays is a complex designed by Arif & Bintoak, also responsible for the Concorde Tower. Along with apartments and villas, the development has shops and other outlets. The three residential buildings are joined by shared a podium. It has luxury apartments with panoramic views of the marina. The buildings are Quay East, Quay West and Quay North. The two shorter buildings are cantilevered, extending 20m over the Dubai Marina waterway. Amenities include a movie theatre, 24 hour security, a pool, concierge service and a swimming pool. As of 2016, luxury penthouses in the buildings sold in excess of 10 million Dirham. In 2018 five million tonnes of rock was added to create a breakwater for Marina Quays.

Park Island

Park Island is a residential development in Dubai, consisting of four towers - Blakely, Bonaire, Fairfield and Sanibel. These towers are surrounded by lush parks and landscaped gardens, creating a tranquil atmosphere that residents can enjoy. The location of Park Island offers easy access to Dubai Marina's thriving business district as well as its many entertainment and leisure facilities. Park Island is the perfect place to live for those who want a peaceful, yet convenient lifestyle. Residents can enjoy the many amenities offered by Dubai Marina such as Dubai Mall, Dubai Marina Mall and Jumeirah Beach Park. They can also take advantage of Dubai's world-class shopping and dining experiences which are only minutes away from their homes. With its stunning views, great location and modern amenities, Park Island is sure to be an attractive option for those looking for quality living in Dubai. 

Park Island offers residents the opportunity to experience luxury living in Dubai at its finest. From the beautifully landscaped gardens to the sophisticated interiors of each apartment tower, every aspect has been designed with style and comfort in mind. The towers also feature a range of shared facilities such as a swimming pool, gymnasium, sauna and steam room. There is also secure underground parking available for residents. Park Island has something to offer everyone who is looking for quality living in Dubai. 

With its four distinctive towers, lush parks and landscaped gardens, Park Island provides residents with an ideal mix of modern convenience and peaceful serenity. This iconic development offers everything that people need in order to enjoy the best life in one of the world’s most vibrant cities. From its breathtaking views to its convenient location, it truly is no wonder why Park Island is one of the most sought-after residential developments in Dubai. .

Dubai Marina Mall

Dubai Marina Mall is a shopping mall located in the center of Dubai Marina and is one of the main shopping malls in Dubai. The mall has been completed and opened in December 2008. The mall is linked to the 5-star Dubai Marina Hotel.

Transportation

Sobha Realty (Dubai Metro)

Sobha Realty (Arabic: شوبا العقارية) (formerly Dubai Marina) is a rapid transit station on the Red Line of the Dubai Metro in Dubai. It opened on 30 April 2010 as part of an extension to Ibn Battuta. It lies to the east of the northern half of the Dubai Marina and to the west of the northern portion of Jumeirah Lake Towers. Dubai Marina station lies on a viaduct paralleling the eastern side of Sheikh Zayed Road. It is categorised as a type 2 elevated station, indicating that there is an elevated concourse between street and platform level. Pedestrian access to the station is aided through walkways above Sheikh Zayed Road, connecting to developments on either side of the road. In September 2014, Damac Properties acquired the naming rights for the Dubai Marina Station, which resulted in it being renamed as the Damac Station.

Dubai Tram

Al Sufouh Tramway is a tramway that operates in Al Sufouh, Dubai Marina. It runs  along Al Sufouh Road from Dubai Marina to the Burj Al Arab and the Mall of the Emirates. It interchanges with two stations of Dubai Metro's Red Line. The Sufouh Tram also connects with the Palm Monorail at the entrance of the Palm from Sufouh Road. After completion in 2014 it serves the residences of Dubai Marina and Jumeirah Beach Residence.

Attractions
A zipline advertised as the "longest urban zipline" was installed here, which links Dubai Marina with the Dubai Marina Mall.

Education
Emirates International School is close to Dubai Marina.

Incidents
On 27 April 2006, a protest broke out among workers in Al Ahmadiya Contracting that caused the blocking of the company's construction site at Dubai Marina, damaging eight cars and two buses, destroying office property and documents, and roughing up a site engineer. The riot control wing of Dubai Police had rushed to the scene to control the situation and the police later succeeded in dispersing the agitating workers.

In August 2015, various people (including police officers) were arrested, after they were caught with prostitutes and illegal alcohol, on a boat in Dubai Marina.

Gallery

See also

 Bluewaters Island
 List of tallest buildings in Dubai
 List of tallest residential buildings in Dubai

References

External links
 

 
2003 establishments in the United Arab Emirates
Communities in Dubai
Canals in the United Arab Emirates
Marinas in the United Arab Emirates
Populated coastal places in the United Arab Emirates
Economy of Dubai